Stratiomys longicornis, the long-horned general, is a European species of soldier fly.

References

Stratiomyidae
Diptera of Europe
Insects described in 1763
Taxa named by Giovanni Antonio Scopoli